= Chulalongkorn Business Academic and Coaching Center =

Training center in Bangkok, Thailand

- ศูนย์ฝึกอบรมด้านธุรกิจของคณะพาณิชยศาสตร์และการบัญชี จุฬาลงกรณ์มหาวิทยาลัย
- Former names: Micro MBA Chula
- Motto: Make you pro
- Type: Foundation
- Established: 1995
- Location: Bangkok, Thailand; 13.734381°N 100.530369°E
- Language: Thai
- Website: www.cbac-chula.com

Chulalongkorn Business Academic and Coaching Center (CBAC; Thai: ศูนย์ฝึกอบรมด้านธุรกิจของคณะพาณิชยศาสตร์และการบัญชี จุฬาลงกรณ์มหาวิทยาลัย) is a training and coaching center in Thailand. It was founded in 1995 by Chulalongkorn Business Administration (CBA), as Micro MBA Chula, in order to provide multiple business courses for Thai people. The center offers the following short business courses:

- Micro MBA
- Effective Digital Marketing
- Effective Branding in Action
